Julius (died AD 190) was a member of the Roman Senate. He is recorded by St. Eusebius and St. Pontian, as a martyr.

He was converted to Christianity by St. Eusebius and baptized by the priest Rufinus. He subsequently distributed his wealth among the poor. When the emperor Commodus heard of this, he had him arrested and handed him over to the military commander Vitellius, by whom he was imprisoned in a dungeon for three days, after which he was beaten to death. His body was taken and buried by St. Eusebius and his colleagues on 19 August near the Via Aurelia.

References

Italian saints
190 deaths
2nd-century Christian martyrs
Year of birth unknown